Emmenthal may refer to:

Emmental, the valley of the Emme River in Switzerland
Emmental cheese, which was originally produced in the Emmental